The Lido in the city of Peterborough, Cambridgeshire was first opened as the Corporation Swimming Pool in 1936 by the Mayor of Peterborough Arthur Mellows, and is one of the few survivors of its type still in use in the United Kingdom. Designed in the "hacienda style", it is considered one of the finest surviving examples in England.

Facilities
The land on which the swimming pool is situated was purchased by the corporation from the Ecclesiastical Commissioners in 1927. 

The site, which also includes two other heated outdoor pools (learner and paddling), a large sunbathing lawn, balcony and refreshment area was designated a Grade II listed building in 1992. It is open to the public from late May to early September, closing during periods of inclement weather.

Peterborough Sub-Aqua Club are official tenants of the Lido, renting some of the rooms beneath the clock tower.

In 2016, the Lido erected a silhouette of Walter Cornelius as a weathercock on the swimming pool's weather vane.

References

Footnotes

Bibliography

External links

The Lido Outdoor Swimming Pool
The Regional Fitness & Swimming Centre
Lidos in the UK
Peterborough Sub-Aqua Club

Lido
Grade II listed buildings in Peterborough
Lidos
Swimming venues in England
Art Deco architecture in England